The highest-selling albums and EPs in the United States are ranked in the Billboard 200, published by Billboard magazine. The data are compiled by Nielsen Soundscan based on each album's weekly physical and digital sales. In 2006, 40 albums topped the chart in 52 issues of the magazine.

High School Musical, the soundtrack to the Disney Channel Original Movie of the same name, is the best-selling album of 2006, accumulating 3.7 million unit sales by the end of the year. The album spent two non-consecutive weeks at the top of Billboard 200, the first TV soundtrack to achieve since the Miami Vice soundtrack in the 1980s. Me and My Gang by Rascal Flatts is ranked second, accumulating 3.5 million total sales by the end of the year. The album sold 722,000 copies in the United States during its debut week, becoming the band's highest first week sales. Me and My Gang is also one of the longest-running of the albums, topping the chart for three consecutive weeks. Other albums with extended chart runs include Unpredictable by Jamie Foxx and the compilation album Now 22, each spent at number one for three weeks.

Barry Manilow's The Greatest Songs of the Fifties topped the chart on the strength of 156,000 unit sales, giving him the first chart-topper album in nearly 29 years of his career, and his best first-week sales since Billboard 200 incorporated data tracked by Nielsen SoundScan in 1991. The band Red Hot Chili Peppers earned their first number-one album, Stadium Arcadium, for the first time in its 22-year career. Stadium Arcadium, which debuted with sales of 442,000 copies, gave the band its career best sales in a week. Prince scored his first number-one album, 3121 since 1989's Batman, in a debut week. Johnny Cash's topped the chart with his posthumous record American V: A Hundred Highways, his first number one since 1969's At San Quentin. Evanescence's The Open Door gave the band its first number-one album, which became the 700th number one in the history of Billboard 200. Diddy's Press Play reached number one in November 2008, giving him his second chart topper in nine years. The album, however, sold 170,000 copies in its debut week, the lowest first-week sales figure for Diddy.

Rapper Jay-Z earned his ninth number-one album, Kingdom Come, tying the Rolling Stones for the third act with the most number-one albums in the United States. The album sold 680,000 copies domestically, giving Jay-Z his best sales in a week. Kingdom Come had the second highest debut sales, behind Justin Timberlake's FutureSex/LoveSounds, which opened at 684,000 units. The compilation series Now That's What I Call Music! produced two number ones this year: series 22 and 23. The 23rd installment gave the series its 10th number one.

Unusually, the best performing album of 2006 (Some Hearts by Carrie Underwood) did not get to number one.

Chart history

See also
2006 in music

References

2006
United States Albums